Hessen (D184) was the fourth ship of the Hamburg-class destroyer of the German Navy.

Background 
The Type 101 Hamburg class was the only class of destroyers built during post-war Germany. They were specifically designed to operate in the Baltic Sea, where armament and speed is more important than seaworthiness. They were named after Bundesländer (states of Germany) of West Germany.

The German shipyard Stülcken was contracted to design and build the ships. Stülcken was rather inexperienced with naval shipbuilding, but got the order, since the shipyards traditionally building warships for the German navies like Blohm + Voss, Howaldtswerke or Lürssen were all occupied constructing commercial vessels.

Construction and career
Hessen was laid down on 5 February 1961 and launched on 4 May 1963 in Hamburg. She was commissioned on 8 October 1968 and decommissioned on 29 March 1990. Finally towed to Portugal and scrapped in 1991.

Gallery

References

Hamburg-class destroyers
1963 ships
Ships built in Hamburg